Pycnanthemum nudum is a species of flowering plant in the mint family known by the common name Coastal Plain mountainmint.  It is endemic to the Southeastern United States and has a limited range across Alabama, Florida, Georgia, and South Carolina.  Along with P. californicum, P. nudum presents no transitional morphology when compared to the rest of Pycnanthemum.  This lack of transitional forms is noteworthy in a genus with such widespread reticulation.

References

nudum